Llangua is a village in Monmouthshire, south-east Wales, United Kingdom. Saint Ciwa is said to have built a church  there in the VIIth century.

Location 
Llangua is located nine miles north-east of Abergavenny on the A465 road.

History & Amenities 
Llangua sits just inside the border with England on the Welsh bank of the River Monnow. The village has a parish church. Grosmont is one mile to the south-east.

External links
Genuki info on Llangua
Bradney on Llangua
Kelly's 1901 Directory of Monmouthshire on Llangua 
www.geograph.co.uk : photos of Llangua and surrounding area

Villages in Monmouthshire